Mary Shannon (married name Mary Wright), (born 12 February 1944) is a retired English table tennis player.

Table tennis career
She won several medals at the world and European championships between 1962 and 1970, including three gold medals in 1962–1964.

She also won seven English Open titles.

Personal life
Shannon worked as a radiographer. On 4 September 1965, she married Brian Wright, her frequent partner in mixed doubles competitions. They had at least three children.

See also
 List of England players at the World Team Table Tennis Championships

References

English female table tennis players
1944 births
Living people
Place of birth missing (living people)
World Table Tennis Championships medalists